This alphabetically arranged list of air forces identifies the current and historical names and roundels for the military aviation arms of countries fielding an air component, whether an independent air forces, a naval aviation, or army aviation units. At the end is a separate list of no longer existent nations that once operated air forces. Country names in italics indicate that they are not generally recognized internationally as independent states but which nonetheless managed to field an active air service. For information on the size of military forces, see list of countries by size of armed forces.

A

|rowspan="10"| 

|rowspan="3"| 

|rowspan="4"| 

|rowspan="3"| 

|rowspan="1"| 

|rowspan="7"| 

|rowspan="1"| 

|rowspan="12"| 

|rowspan="3"| 

|rowspan="1"| 

|}

B

| 

|rowspan="3"| 

|rowspan="5"| 

	
|rowspan="1"| 

|rowspan="2"| 

|rowspan="8"| 

| 

|rowspan="3"| 

| 

|rowspan="4"| 

|rowspan="5"| 

| 

|rowspan="6"| 

|rowspan="3"| 

|rowspan="11"| 

|rowspan="2"| 

| 

|}

C

|rowspan="8"| 

|rowspan="1"| 

|rowspan="11"| 

|rowspan="2"| 

|rowspan= "3"| 

| 

|rowspan="4| 

|rowspan="4"| 

|rowspan="4"| 

|

|rowspan="3"| 

|rowspan="2"| 

|rowspan="3"| 

|  (Ivory Coast)

|rowspan="3"| 

|rowspan="5"| 

|rowspan="3"| 

| 

|}

D

|rowspan="8"| 

| (formerly the French Territory of Afars and Issas)

|rowspan="16"| 

|}

E

|rowspan=1 | 

|rowspan="3"| 

|rowspan="6"| 

|rowspan="1"| 

| 

|rowspan="1"| 

|rowspan="4"| 

|rowspan="2"| (formerly Swaziland)

|rowspan="8"| 

|}

F

|rowspan="1"| 

|rowspan="6"| 

|rowspan="12"| 

|}

G

|rowspan="1"| 

| (formerly part of the Senegambia Confederation)

|rowspan="3"| 

|rowspan="16"| 

 

|rowspan="2"| (formerly the Gold Coast)

|rowspan="8"|

|rowspan="5"| 

| 

| (formerly Portuguese Guinea)

|rowspan="2"| (formerly British Guyana)

|}

H

|rowspan="3"| 

|rowspan="4"| 

|rowspan="10"| 

|}

I
For Ivory Coast, see Côte d'Ivoire above.

|rowspan="2"| 

|rowspan="9"| 

|rowspan="7"| 

|rowspan="8"| (formerly Persia)

|rowspan="5"| 

|rowspan="3"| 

|rowspan="4"| 

|rowspan="1"| 

|rowspan="20"| 

|}

J

|rowspan=1| 

|rowspan=5| 

|rowspan=2| (formerly Transjordan)

|}

K

| 

| rowspan="3"|

| 

| rowspan="7"|

|rowspan="4"| 

| 

|}

L

|rowspan="4"| 

|rowspan="4"| 

| 

|rowspan="3"| (formerly Basutoland)

|rowspan="2"| 

|rowspan="5"| 

|rowspan="4"| 

|rowspan="1"|
 
|}

M

|rowspan="2"| 

| (formerly the Malagasy Republic)

|rowspan="3"| (formerly Nyasaland)

|rowspan="9"| (formerly Malaya)

| 

| 

|rowspan="2"| 

|rowspan="2"| 

| 

|rowspan="3"| 

| 

|rowspan="2"| 

|rowspan="2"| 

|rowspan="5"| 

|rowspan="2"| 

|rowspan="2"| (formerly Burma)

 
|}

N

|rowspan="3"| (formerly South West Africa)

|rowspan="1"| 

|rowspan="3"| 

|rowspan="11"| 

LOAF

|rowspan="1"|  Dutch Caribbean

|rowspan="7"| 

|rowspan="10"| 

|rowspan="2"| 

|rowspan="3"| 

|rowspan="4"| 

|}

O

|rowspan="2"| (formerly Muscat and Oman)

|}

P

|rowspan="4"| 

|rowspan="2"| 

|rowspan="2'|  

|rowspan="3"| 

|rowspan="8"| 

|rowspan="11"| 

|rowspan="13"| 

|rowspan="11"| 

|}

Q

|rowspan="2"| 

|}

R

|rowspan="17"| 

|rowspan="13"| 

| (formerly Ruanda-Urundi)

|}

S

|rowspan="6"| 

|rowspan="3"| (formerly part of the Senegambia Confederation)

|rowspan="8"| 

|rowspan="2"| 

| 

|rowspan="4"| 

|rowspan="4"| 

|rowspan="4"| 

|rowspan="3"| 

|rowspan="7"| 

| 

|rowspan="14"| 

|rowspan="2"| (formerly Ceylon)

|rowspan="2"| (formerly the Anglo-Egyptian Sudan)

|rowspan="2"| (formerly Dutch Guyana)

|rowspan="10"| 

{{LOAF entry|service=Swedish Volunteer Air CorpsHome Guard (Sweden), Swedish Armed Forces ||date=1961}}

|rowspan="3"| 

|rowspan="5"| 

|}

T

|rowspan="13"| 

| 

|rowspan="2"| (formerly Tanganyika)

|rowspan="9"| (formerly Siam)

|rowspan="2"| 

| 

|rowspan="3"| 

| 

|rowspan="12"| 

|rowspan="2"| 

|}

U

|rowspan="3"| 

|rowspan="8"| 

|rowspan="7"| 

|rowspan="21"| 

|rowspan="32"| 

|rowspan="7"| 

|rowspan="1"|

|}

V

|rowspan="11"| 

|rowspan="6"| 

|}

Y

|rowspan="3"| 

|}

Z

|rowspan="3"| (formerly Northern Rhodesia)

|rowspan="8"|  (formerly Southern Rhodesia)

|}

Former countries and movements

|rowspan="1"| 

|rowspan="5"| 

| |rowspan="2"| 

|rowspan="1"| 

| 

| 

| Reorganized National Government of the Republic of China(Wang Jingwei regime)
 

| 

| 

|rowspan="7"| 
 Czech and Slovak Federal Republic
 Czechoslovak Socialist Republic
 Third Czechoslovak Republic
 Czechoslovak government-in-exile
 Second Czechoslovak Republic
 First Czechoslovak Republic

|rowspan="1"|  Slovak Republic

|

|

|

|rowspan="2" |

|rowspan="3"|

| 

|rowspan="1"|  Irish Free state

|rowspan="1"|  Kingdom of Nejd and Hejaz Kingdom of Hejaz

|  Imperial State of Iran

|rowspan="2"| Kingdom of Italy 

|rowspan="4"|  People's Republic of Kampuchea Democratic Kampuchea Kingdom of Cambodia

|Makhnovshchina

|  Malagasy Republic

|rowspan="4"|  / Federated Malay States / Unfederated Malay States / Malayan Union /

|rowspan="2"| 

|

|rowspan="1"| 

|rowspan="2"|  Dutch East Indies

|rowspan="2"|  Mutawakkilite Kingdom of Yemen/

| 

|rowspan="2"| 

|  Pathet Lao

|rowspan="5"|    

|  Senegambia Confederation

| 

|  Republic of Serbian Krajina

|rowspan="3"|  Rattanakosin Kingdom of Siam

|  South West Africa

|rowspan="2"|  State of Vietnam /

|rowspan="2"|  Federation of South Arabia /

|

|rowspan="7"|  Russian Empire  Russian Provisional Government  Russian Republic  

| ''

|

|rowspan="3"| 

| 

| 

|  Vichy France

|rowspan="4"| 

|  West Ukrainian People's Republic

|

|rowspan="9"|  / State of Slovenes, Croats and Serbs / /Yugoslav government-in-exile / / / /

|rowspan="2"|

|rowspan="4"|Republic of the Congo (Léopoldville)

|

|}

Other

|rowspan="2"| 
     

|rowspan="3"| 

|  

| 

| 

| 

| 

|}

See also
 Lists of military aircraft by nation
 List of militaries by country
 List of armies by country
 List of navies
 List of space forces
 List of gendarmeries

Notes

External links
 Cocardes du monde entier – Roundels of the World

 
Air forces
Air forces
.Air forces